The Richland County Courthouse in Wahpeton, North Dakota, USA, was built in 1912. It was designed by the architects Buechner & Orth in Beaux Arts style. It was listed on the National Register of Historic Places in 1980.

Its exterior is built of Bedford limestone atop "rusticated Kettle River sandstone". The front facade features four Corinithian columns. The building has an octagonal limestone tower with windows on all eight sides and a metal-covered dome topped by a ball finial. The interior rotunda features murals with white marble and terrazzo.

References

Courthouses on the National Register of Historic Places in North Dakota
County courthouses in North Dakota
Beaux-Arts architecture in North Dakota
Government buildings completed in 1912
1912 establishments in North Dakota
National Register of Historic Places in Richland County, North Dakota
Wahpeton, North Dakota